"Learning as You Go" is a song written by Larry Boone and Billy Lawson, and recorded by American country music artist Rick Trevino.  It was released in June 1996 as the first single and title track from the album Learning as You Go.  The single reached number 2 on the Billboard Hot Country Singles & Tracks chart.

Content
The song offers a unique twist on the phrase, "learning as you go" as the narrator states that he is learning about relationships now that his significant other has left him.

Critical reception
Deborah Evans Price, of Billboard magazine reviewed the song favorably saying that Trevino has finally recorded a song that he can "sink his teeth into." She goes on to say that the song should be a strong contender for airplay in the summer.

Music video
The music video was directed by Jon Small and premiered in May 1996.

Chart performance
"Learning as You Go" debuted at number 63 on the U.S. Billboard Hot Country Singles & Tracks for the week of June 1, 1996.

Year-end charts

References

1996 singles
1996 songs
Rick Trevino songs
Songs written by Larry Boone
Song recordings produced by Steve Buckingham (record producer)
Columbia Records singles
Song recordings produced by Doug Johnson (record producer)